The Sirente-Velino Regional Park (Italian: Parco regionale naturale del Sirente Velino) is a regional park in the province of L'Aquila,  Abruzzo, central Italy.

It is centered on the Monte Velino and Monte Sirente massifs, including also the Rocche  plateau and the Piani di Pezza and Campo Felice plains. The seat of the park is in Rocca di Mezzo.

External links 
 Official website
 

Regional parks of Italy
Parks in Abruzzo